The Egyptian cobra (Naja haje), also known as Ouraeus (derived from the Ancient Greek word: οὐραῖος - ), is one of the most venomous snakes in North Africa, which has caused many snakebite incidents to humans.

Etymology and taxonomy 
Naja haje was first described by Swedish zoologist Carl Linnaeus in 1758. The generic name naja is a Latinisation of the Sanskrit word  meaning "cobra". The specific epithet haje is derived from the Arabic word ḥayya (حية) which literally means "snake". The snouted cobra (Naja annulifera) and Anchieta's cobra (Naja anchietae) were formerly regarded as subspecies of Naja haje, but have since been shown to be distinct species. The Arabian populations were long recognised as a separate subspecies, Naja haje arabica, and the black populations from Morocco sometimes as Naja haje legionis. A recent study found that the Arabian cobra constitutes a separate species, Naja arabica, whereas the subspecies legionis was synonymised with N. haje. The same study also identified the West African savanna populations as a separate species and described it as Naja senegalensis.

The cladogram below illustrates the taxonomy and relationships among species of Naja following Van Wallach et al. (2009), with subgenus Uraeus resolved following Trape et al. (2009):

Description

The Egyptian cobra is a large species. The head is large and depressed and slightly distinct from the neck. The neck of this species has long cervical ribs capable of expanding to form a hood, like all other cobras. The snout of the Egyptian cobra is moderately broad and rounded. The eye is quite big with a round pupil. The body of the Egyptian cobra is cylindrical and stout, with a long tail. The length of the Egyptian cobra is largely dependent on subspecies, geographical locale, and population. The most recognizable characteristics of this species are its head and hood.

The colour is highly variable, but most specimens are some shade of brown, and often a "tear-drop" mark below the eye. Some are more copper-red or grey-brown in colour. Specimens from northwestern Africa (Morocco, Western Sahara) are almost entirely black. The ventral side is mostly a creamy white, yellow brown, grayish, blue grey, dark brown or black in colouration, often with dark spots.

Scalation
Naja haje has the following scalation. The dorsal scales at midbody number 19-20. The ventral scales number 191-220. The anal plate is single. The subcaudal scales are paired and number 53-65. There is 1 preocular, 3 (or 2) postoculars, and 2 or 3 suboculars. The upper labials number 7 (rarely 6 or 8), and are separated from the eye by the suboculars. The lower labials number 8. The temporal scales are arranged 1+2 or 1+3, varying.

Geographic range

The Egyptian cobra ranges across most of North Africa north of the Sahara, across the savannas of West Africa to the south of the Sahara, south to the Congo Basin and east to Kenya and Tanzania. Older literature records from Southern Africa and the Arabian Peninsula refer to other species (see taxonomy section).

In zoos
The Egyptian cobra can also be found in captivity at zoos, both in and outside the snake’s natural range. The Giza Zoo, San Diego Zoo, and the Virginia Aquarium include the Egyptian cobra in their reptile collections.

Bronx Zoo escape
On March 26, 2011, the Bronx Zoo informed the public that their reptile house was closed after a venomous adolescent female banded Egyptian cobra was discovered missing from its off-exhibit enclosure on March 25.
Zoo officials were confident the missing cobra would be found in the building and not outside, since the Egyptian cobra is known to be uncomfortable in open areas.  The snake's metabolism would also have been impacted by the cold weather outdoors at that time in the Bronx. The cobra was found in a dark corner of the zoo's reptile house on March 31, 2011, in good health.  After a contest, she was named "Mia" for "missing in action."

Habitat

Naja haje occurs in a wide variety of habitats like, steppes, dry to moist savannas, arid semi-desert regions with some water and vegetation. This species is frequently found near water. The Egyptian cobra is also found in agricultural fields and scrub vegetation. It also occurs in the presence of humans, where it often enters houses. It is attracted to villages by rodent pests (rats) and domestic chickens. There are also notes of the Egyptian cobra swimming in the Mediterranean Sea, and is often found in water.

Behaviour and ecology
The Egyptian cobra is a terrestrial and crepuscular or  nocturnal species. It can, however, be seen basking in the sun at times in the early morning. This species shows a preference for a permanent home base in abandoned animal burrows, termite mounds or rock outcrops. It is an active forager, sometimes entering human habitations, especially when hunting domestic fowl. Like other cobra species, it generally attempts to escape when approached, at least for a few metres, but if threatened it assumes the typical upright posture with the hood expanded, and strikes. This species prefers to eat toads, but it will prey on small mammals, birds, eggs, lizards and other snakes.

Venom

The venom of the Egyptian cobra consists mainly of neurotoxins and cytotoxins. The average venom yield is 175 to 300 mg in a single bite, and the murine subcutaneous  value is 1.15 mg/kg. However, Mohamed et al. (1973) recorded  (mice) values of 0.12 mg/kg and 0.25 mg/kg via intraperitoneal injections of specimens from Egypt. Irwin et al. (1970) studied the venom toxicity of a number of elapids, including Naja haje from different geographical locations. Venom potency ranged from 0.08 mg/kg to 1.7 mg/kg via intravenous injections on mice.

The study also found that Egyptian cobra specimens from northern Africa, particularly those from Egypt, Tunisia, Algeria and Libya, to have significantly more potent venom than N. haje specimens found in the species' more southern and western geographical range, including Sudan and those from West Africa (Senegal, Nigeria, and Mali).

The venom affects the nervous system, stopping the nerve signals from being transmitted to the muscles and at later stages stopping those transmitted to the heart and lungs as well, causing death due to complete respiratory failure. Envenomation causes local pain, severe swelling, bruising, blistering, necrosis and variable non-specific effects which may include headache, nausea, vomiting, abdominal pain, diarrhea, dizziness, collapse or convulsions along with possible moderate to severe flaccid paralysis.

Unlike some other African cobras (for example, the red spitting cobra), this species does not spit venom.

Other cultures

In Ancient Egyptian culture and history

The Egyptian cobra was represented in Egyptian mythology by the cobra-headed goddess Meretseger. A stylised Egyptian cobrain the form of the uraeus representing the goddess Wadjetwas the symbol of sovereignty for the Pharaohs who incorporated it into their diadem. This iconography was continued through the end of the ancient Egyptian civilization (30 BC).

Most ancient sources attribute the deaths of the Egyptian queen Cleopatra and her two handmaidens to the bite of an Egyptian cobra after the fall of Egypt to Octavian. The snake was reportedly smuggled into her chambers in a basket of figs. Plutarch wrote that Cleopatra had experimented on condemned prisoners with various poisons and snake venoms, finding aspis venom to be the most painless of all fatal toxins. In Ptolemaic Egypt, the term "aspis" (an ancient Greek word referring to a wide variety of venomous snakes) was most likely an Egyptian cobra. This aspect of her apparent suicide has been questioned in recent years, as the relatively large size of the snake would have made it difficult to conceal, and because Egyptian cobra venom is slow-acting and does not always cause death.

As a pet
The Egyptian cobra garnered increased attention in Canada in the fall of 2006 when a pet cobra became loose and forced the evacuation of a house in Toronto for more than three hours when it was believed to have sought refuge in the home's walls. The owner was fined $17,000 and jailed for a year.

In magic acts
In July 2018, Aref Ghafouri was bitten by an Egyptian cobra while preparing for a show in Turkey.  He was evacuated to Egypt for treatment with the antivenom and made a full recovery.

References

Further reading
Boulenger GA (1896). Catalogue of the Snakes in the British Museum (Natural History). Volume III., Containing the Colubridæ (Opisthoglyphæ and Proteroglyphæ) ... London: Trustees of the British Museum (Natural History). (Taylor and Francis, printers). xiv + 727 pp. + Plates I–XXV. ("Naia haie [sic]", pp. 374–375).
Linnaeus C (1758). Systema naturæ per regna tria naturæ, secundum classes, ordines, genera, species, cum characteribus, differentiis, synonymis, locis. Tomus I. Editio Decima, Reformata. Stockholm: L. Salvius. 824 pp. (Coluber haje, new species, p. 225) .

External links

 
 Egyptian Cobra

Egyptian cobra
Egyptian cobra
Egyptian cobra
Reptiles of North Africa
Reptiles of South Sudan
Snakes of Africa
Wadjet
Fauna of Egypt